Manila Kingpin: The Untold Story of Asiong Salonga (also marketed as Manila Kingpin: The Asiong Salonga Story) is a 2011 Filipino biographical-crime film directed by Tikoy Aguiluz and Darryl "Gary" dela Cruz and starring Jeorge "E.R." Estregan in the title role, alongside Carla Abellana, Phillip Salvador, John Regala, Ronnie Lazaro, Baron Geisler, Joko Diaz, Archie Adamos, Yul Servo, Dennis Padilla, and Ketchup Eusebio. Produced by Scenema Concept International, it was released by Viva Films as an entry to the 37th Metro Manila Film Festival, where it won 11 awards, including for Best Picture, Best Director (dela Cruz), and Best Actor (Estregan).

Aguiluz disowned the film before release after the film was reedited by the producers without his permission.

Plot
Manila Kingpin is based on the story of the notorious Tondo, Manila, gang leader Nicasio "Asiong" Salonga whose true-to-life accounts had been portrayed in several movie versions since 1961 (starring Joseph Estrada). It is also the first Filipino major film produced in black-and-white in the 21st century as well as the returning action genre movie.

Manila Kingpin is the replacing entry to the original projects Mr. Wong (starring Robin Padilla) and Hototay (Regal Films, starring Nora Aunor), after the latter two had backed out from the event.

Cast
Jeorge "E.R." Estregan as Nicasio "Asiong" Salonga
Carla Abellana as Fidela Fernandez-Salonga
Phillip Salvador as Sgt. Domingo "Domeng" Salonga
John Regala as Totoy Golem (Carlos Capistrano)
Ronnie Lazaro as Boy Zapanta (Ángel Zapanta)
Baron Geisler as Erning Toothpick (Ernesto Reyes)
Joko Diaz as Pepeng Hapon
Archie Adamos as Turong Pajo
Yul Servo as Bimbo
Dennis Padilla as Tambol
Ketchup Eusebio as Kiko
Ping Medina as Piring
Gerald Ejercito as Badong
Amay Bisaya as Ayes Gago

Cameos
Roi Vinzon as Viray
Jay Manalo as Prison Mayor Guardame
Valerie Concepcion as Mely (Asiong's mistress)
Jaycee Parker as Fe (Asiong's mistress)
Paloma Esmeria as Rosing (Asiong's mistress)
Roldan Aquino as Hepe Villagonzalo
Robert Arevalo as Cando Salonga
Perla Bautista as Maria Salonga
Dante Rivero as Luis Fernandez
Marissa Sanchez as Carmen
Jerico Ejercito as young Asiong
Ely Buendia as Band Lead Singer

Accolades

Soundtrack
"La Paloma" by Ely Buendia
"Hari ng Tondo" by Gloc-9 featuring Denise Barbacena

References

External links

Manila Kingpin: The Asiong Salonga Story on Movie Adventures.

2011 films
2010s crime films
Films about organized crime in the Philippines
Films set in Manila
Films set in the 1950s
Neo-noir
Philippine biographical films
Philippine black-and-white films
Philippine crime drama films
Philippine films based on actual events